cwRsync is an implementation of rsync for Windows. rsync uses a file transfer technology specified by the rsync algorithm, transferring only changed chunks of files over the network. cwRsync can be used for remote file backup and synchronization from/to Windows systems. cwRsync contains Cygwin DLLs and a compiled version of rsync on Cygwin. A client GUI is also provided as of the version 5.0.0.

History 

The first version of cwRsync was developed to address requirements of an internal project at Color Line, and was published as a free solution on the mailing list for rsync users. cwRsync quickly became very popular and is kept updated with newer versions of underlying solutions. The initial release was on  March 11, 2003

As of August 2018 the free version of cwRsync server is discontinued and the last free version 5.7.2 is no longer directly available from Itefix. 
At this point only the commercial binary installers of version 5.7.2 can be obtained as paid downloads.  cwRsync Client remains freely available under a BSD-style licence.

Features 

cwRsync comes in two versions: cwRsync client and cwRsync server.  You can use the cwRsync client to initiate rsync transfers from your host, while the cwRsync server makes your files/directories available for upload/download for rsync transfers. cwRsync client contains a Secure channel wrapper to set up external secure ssh channels.

Rsync client GUI has following features:

 Specify sources and destination (local, remote ssh and daemon modes)
 Specify filters and a subset of options
 Create rsync command according to your specification
 Run rsync on the fly both in production and test mode
 Create batch files for task scheduling
 Save and load your favorite rsync settings as profiles
 Language localization

See also 
 GS RichCopy 360
 rsync
 File Transfer Protocol

References

External links
 

Internet Protocol based network software
file transfer software